Winifred May, Marquesa de Casa Maury (née Birkin; 28 July 1894 – 16 March 1983), universally known by her first married name as Freda Dudley Ward, was an English socialite best known for being a married paramour of the Prince of Wales, who later became Edward VIII.

Biography
Born Winifred May Birkin, she was the second child and eldest of three daughters of British Colonel Charles Wilfred Birkin (fourth son of a lace embroidery and tableware magnate of Nottingham, Sir Thomas Birkin, 1st Baronet), and his American wife, Claire Lloyd Howe.

Although married in 1913 to William Dudley Ward, Freda was also in a relationship with Edward, Prince of Wales from 1918, until she was supplanted by American Thelma Furness (née Morgan) from 1929 to 1934; Thelma introduced Edward to Wallis Simpson. The relationship between the Prince of Wales and the married Ward was common knowledge in aristocratic circles. Winston Churchill observed in 1927, after travelling with them on a train, "It is quite pathetic to see the Prince and Freda. His love is so obvious and undisguisable."

Marriages and children
Freda was married twice. Her first marriage was on 9 July 1913 to William Dudley Ward, Liberal MP for Southampton. Her first husband's family surname was Ward, but 'Dudley Ward' became their official surname through common usage. Their divorce took place on the ground of adultery in 1931. They had two daughters:

 Penelope Ann Rachel Dudley Ward (4 August 1914 – 22 January 1982), the actress Penelope Dudley-Ward, later Lady Reed, known as Pempie, who married firstly in 1939 (divorced 1944) Anthony Pelissier, by whom she had a daughter, and secondly in 1948 film director Sir Carol Reed, by whom she had a son.
 Tracy Reed (1942–2012, b. Clare Pelissier), actress; first wife of actor Edward Fox, who later played Edward VIII in Edward & Mrs. Simpson in which their affair is depicted; they had one daughter.
 Max Reed (b. 1948)
 Claire Angela Louise Dudley Ward (25 May 1916 – 9 December 1999), later Lady Laycock, or Angie, who married in 1935 the commando leader Major-General Sir Robert Laycock, by whom she had two sons and three daughters. Of her five children, her son:
 Joseph William Peter Laycock (Joe Laycock; 1938–1980); married actress Lucy Fleming, niece of writer Ian Fleming, the creator of James Bond; and had issue.

A few years after her divorce, she married, on 20 October 1937, the Cuban theater impresario Pedro Jose Isidro Manuel Ricardo Mones, Marques de Casa Maury. From 1938, the couple took up residence in St John's Wood, London, at 58 Hamilton Terrace, which they commissioned from the architects Burnet, Tait, and Lorne. They divorced in 1954.

Legacy
A portrait of her by the artist John Singer Sargent was discovered on the television series Antiques Roadshow in 2016.

Footnotes

Sources
 Burke's Peerage and Baronetage 107th Edition Volume III at Burke's Peerage – Preview Family Record 
 King of Fools by John Parker

External links 

1894 births
1983 deaths
Socialites from London
Mistresses of Edward VIII
Marchionesses
Freda
Birkin family
English people of American descent